The Kirin Open was a golf tournament in Japan. It was founded in 1972 as the season ending event on the Asia Golf Circuit, replacing the Yomiuri International which had been cancelled when sponsors decided to discontinue the event. It was also a fixture on the Japan Golf Tour from 1974 until 2001.

It was played at Sobu Country Club in Inzai until 1976. In 1977 Dunlop became title sponsors and the tournament was moved to Ibaraki Golf Club in Ibaraki.

Winners

Notes

References

External links
Coverage on Japan Golf Tour's official site

Asia Golf Circuit events
Former Japan Golf Tour events
Defunct golf tournaments in Japan
Sport in Ibaraki Prefecture
Recurring sporting events established in 1972
Recurring sporting events disestablished in 2001
1972 establishments in Japan
2001 disestablishments in Japan